316th Division or 316th Infantry Division may refer to:

 316th Rifle Division (Soviet Union)
 316th Division (Vietnam)